George Edward David Pytches (born 9 January 1931) is a bishop of the Anglican Communion and the former Bishop of Chile, Bolivia and Peru. Pytches was also vicar of St Andrew's, in Chorleywood England. He is the author of many books, including Come Holy Spirit and his autobiography, Living at the Edge. He is the founder of the New Wine conferences with his wife Mary, who is also an author in the field of Christian counselling.

He was consecrated a bishop on 20 December 1970, by Kenneth Howell, Bishop of Chile, Bolivia and Peru, in St Paul's Church, Valparaíso, to serve as assistant bishop for the Valparaíso region in the Diocese of Chile, Bolivia and Peru; in 1972 he became diocesan bishop of that diocese, serving until his return to England in 1977.

Pytches supported the Soul Survivor movement in England during its early days and throughout its history; for example, the Soul in the City event was supported by a large donation received from a New Wine conference only days before.

Pytches, along with Bishop C. FitzSimons Allison and four others, participated in the consecration in 2000, in Singapore, of two bishops opposed to the blessing of same-sex unions by the Episcopal Church USA.

Pytches and his wife gave the leadership of New Wine over to John and Anne Coles in 2001, but still visit the conferences every year and continue to speak there.

Pytches's son-in-law, Christopher Cocksworth, has been Bishop of Coventry since March 2008.

Books
Pastoral Prayer Ministry Training
Prophecy In The Local Church
Leadership For New Life
Does God Speak Today?
Some Said It Thundered:A Personal Encounter with the Kansas City Prophets (1991)
Come Holy Spirit: Learning How to Minister in Power (with John Wimber) (1994)
John Wimber: a Tribute
Spiritual Gifts in the Local Church
Living at the Edge (2002)
Can Anyone Be A Leader? (2004)
Upside Down: Living the Beatitudes in the 21st Century (2007)

References

External links
Upside Down book review

1931 births
Anglican bishops of Chile, Bolivia and Peru
Living people